Miguel Antonio Otero (June 21, 1829 – May 30, 1882) was a prominent American politician of the New Mexico Territory and instrumental in the economic development of the territory.

Early life 
Miguel Antonio Otero was born in Valencia, Nuevo México to Don Vicente Otero and Doña Gertrudis Aragón de Otero. Don Vicente had held prominent civic positions as judge and mayor in Valencia County, under both Spanish and Mexican Governments.

Otero received his early education in Valencia. In 1841 he enrolled at St. Louis University in the state of Missouri and subsequently graduated from Pingree College in Fishkill, New York, where he taught while he began his study of law. In 1851 he returned to Missouri, where he studied law and was admitted to the bar.

In 1852, he returned to New Mexico and led a herd of sheep, thought to belong to his brother, Antonio José Otero, overland to California. Returning from California, he practiced law for a short time.

He was a public advocate of the Mexican–American War.

Career as politician 

In 1852 Otero became the private secretary to the Governor of New Mexico, William C. Lane, and was elected to the second Legislative Assembly of the territory of New Mexico. In 1854 he was appointed attorney general for the territory, and served for two years. On July 23, 1856 he was seated as a Democratic Delegate to the U.S. House of Representatives, after successfully contesting the election of José Manuel Gallegos. With the support of the Bishop of New Mexico, Jean Baptiste Lamy, Otero was reelected to the next two Congresses, but was not a candidate for renomination in 1860.

An outspoken Congressman and a strong supporter of the railroad, Otero devoted much of his efforts to the construction of the transcontinental railroad through New Mexico.  He introduced the Memorial of the New Mexican Railway Company, in Relation to the Pacific Railroad on May 21, 1860.

After Otero had completed his term in Congress, President Abraham Lincoln nominated him to be minister to Spain in 1861. Otero declined that office to accept an appointment as secretary of the territory of New Mexico, but the Senate did not confirm him because of his involvement in the 1860 Democratic National Convention in South Carolina and his pro-confederate tendencies.

During the Confederate invasion of New Mexico, the Confederate Army of the West accessed Otero's stores which contained hundreds of thousands of dollars of merchandise. These supplies helped allowed the Confederate Army to sack Albuquerque in March 1862. It was a matter of public dispute over whether Otero was forced by the Confederate Army, with allegations that Otero had willingly cooperated.

Otero failed in another reelection bid in 1880. His business endeavors, however, in merchandizing, banking, and farming, were highly successful. In addition, he was a strong supporter of the Atchison, Topeka and Santa Fe Railway. And he became one of the founders and later president of the San Miguel National Bank in Las Vegas, New Mexico. He also engaged in out-of-state endeavors, mostly in Kansas City, Missouri.

He died in 1882 at the age of 52 and was buried in Denver's Riverside Cemetery. His son, also named Miguel Antonio Otero, and nephew Mariano S. Otero would continue the family tradition of civic service, his son becoming Governor of New Mexico, and his nephew a delegate.

Both Otero County, New Mexico and Otero County, Colorado are named in his honor.

See also
 List of Hispanic Americans in the United States Congress

References

External links 

1829 births
1882 deaths
Hispanic and Latino American Confederates
People of Santa Fe de Nuevo Mexico
Members of the New Mexico Territorial Legislature
American people of Spanish descent
Neomexicanos
Delegates to the United States House of Representatives from New Mexico Territory
Hispanic and Latino American members of the United States Congress
New Mexico Democrats
19th-century American politicians